General Philipps may refer to:

Ivor Philipps (1861–1940), British Indian Army major general
Richard Philipps (1661–1750), British Army general
Wilhelm Philipps (1894–1971), Wehrmacht lieutenant general

See also
Pleasant J. Philips (1819–1876), Confederate States Army brigadier general
General Phillips (disambiguation)
General Philipp (disambiguation)